Dejan Prijić (born 2 January 1984) is a Croatian footballer who most recently played for Grafičar Vodovod.

Club career
Prijić began his career with NK Osijek, and he played in the Croatian Prva HNL for the club. He also had loan spells at NK Pula 1856 and HNK Cibalia. After leaving Osijek, Prijić went on to play for NK HAŠK and NK Belišće in the Druga HNL before returning to the Prva HNL with NK Međimurje in January 2008.

International career
Prijić played for the Croatia national football team at various youth levels, and participated in the 2001 FIFA World Youth Championship in Trinidad and Tobago.

References

External links
 

1984 births
Living people
Sportspeople from Osijek
Association football defenders
Croatian footballers
Croatia youth international footballers
Croatia under-21 international footballers
NK Osijek players
NK Istra 1961 players
HNK Cibalia players
NK HAŠK players
NK Belišće players
NK Međimurje players
NK Karlovac players
R.A.A. Louviéroise players
HNK Vukovar '91 players
NK Metalac Osijek players
NK BSK Bijelo Brdo players
NK Grafičar Vodovod players
Croatian Football League players
First Football League (Croatia) players
Belgian Third Division players
Croatian expatriate footballers
Expatriate footballers in Belgium
Croatian expatriate sportspeople in Belgium